Springfield is a civil parish in Kings County, New Brunswick, Canada.

For governance purposes it is divided between the village of Norton and the local service district of the parish of Norton, both of which are members of Regional Service Commission 8 (RSC8).

Origin of name
The name was common in the Thirteen Colonies, now famously found at least once in every state of the United States.

Notable is that the names of Kings County's pre-1800 parishes all occur in both New Jersey and North Carolina.

History
Springfield was erected in 1786 as one of the original parishes of the county.

In 1795 the boundaries were altered as part of the reorganisation of Kings County parishes.

In 1860 part of the parish was included in the newly erected Kars Parish.

In 1880 the boundary with Studholm was altered.

In 1896 the southern boundary was altered.

In 1899 the boundary was again altered.

Boundaries
Springfield Parish is bounded:

on the northwest by the Queens County line;
on the northeast and east by a line beginning on the county line about 2.5 kilometres southwest of the Pearsonville Road, then southeasterly along the prolongation of the northeastern line of a grant southeast of Route 870 and southwest of the Collina Road, to a point about 1.6 kilometres past Route 870, then southwesterly along grant lines before a switchback easterly to a point about 450 metres northeast of the mouth of Snyder Brook, then southwesterly to the southeastern corner of a grant to Henry A. Scovil, about 150 metres northeasterly of a curve in the O'Neill Road, then southerly about 1.35 kilometres past Route 875 and about 450 metres north of Parleeville Road;
on the southeast by a line running south 60º west, 65 chains (1.3 kilometres) inland of and parallel to the rear line of a tier of grants on the south side of Belleisle Bay, to point about 350 metres northeast of Route 845 and about 450 metres northwest of Rogers Road, on the southwestern line of a grant to Jeremiah Maybe;
on the west by grant lines beginning on the southwestern line of Jeremiah Maybe, then northwesterly to the northwestern corner of the Maybe grant, then northeasterly about 275 metres to the southwestern corner of the William Roden grant on the southern side of Belleisle Bay, then northerly to Belleisle Bay and northeasterly across the bay to the Kars Parish line, about 450 metres east of the eastern end of Coreyvale Road, then northwesterly along three grant lines, with two short doglegs, to the Queens County line at a point about 900 metres northeast of the ends of Bond Road and McCrea Road.

Communities
Communities at least partly within the parish; bold indicates an incorporated municipality

Belleisle Creek
Bull Moose Hill
Case Settlement
East Scotch Settlement
Elm Brook
Hatfield Point
Irish Settlement
Joliffs Brook
Keirsteadville
Long Point
Lower Midland
Norton
Midland
Upper Midland
Northrups Corner
Pascobac
Searsville
Springfield
Stewarton
The Grant
Upper Belleisle
West Scotch Settlement

Bodies of water
Bodies of water at least partly in the parish:
Belleisle Creek
Belleisle Bay
Jack Lake

Demographics
Parish population total does not include the village of Norton

Population
Population trend

Access Routes
Highways and numbered routes that run through the parish, including external routes that start or finish at the parish limits:

Highways
none

Principal Routes

Secondary Routes:

External Routes:
None

See also
List of parishes in New Brunswick

Notes

References

Parishes of Kings County, New Brunswick